Dalton City is a Lucky Luke comic written by Goscinny and illustrated by Morris. The original Belgian/French comic was published by Dargaud in 1969. English editions of this Belgian/French series have been published by Dargaud, and by Cinebook in 2006.

Plot

Lucky Luke closes down the corrupt settlement of Fenton Town, Texas and arrests the owner, Dean Fenton. Fenton brags about his town to the Daltons while in prison. A mix-up with the newly installed telegraph results in Joe Dalton being released for 'good behavior'. He breaks out the others and they decide to fix up Fenton Town, renaming it Dalton City. They capture Lucky Luke, who agrees to help them with the town. They hire some dancing girls and Lucky Luke plants the idea of staging a wedding to lure people. The wedding is between Joe and Lulu Breechloader, the singer. The guests arrive, but when the wedding is announced, it turns out that Lulu was unaware and is already married to the pianist, Wallace. Initially the guests shoot at Lucky Luke, but turn on Joe. The Cavalry arrives to round the criminals up, having been tipped off by Wild Trout, an Indian who won at roulette, having bet a vase, and expecting 36 other vases. After everyone has left, Belle, one of the dancing girls, manages to jump out of the (abnormally hard) cake.

Dalton City eventually becomes Angel Junction, a town of 243,000 people.

Characters 

 Lulu Breechloader: Singer and leader of a group of dancers working for the Dalton saloon. In this album, Joe and William Dalton have a crush on her. Lucky Luke uses it to trap them. She is a caricature of Mae West.
 The Dalton brothers: Four ugly, stupid bandits.

References

 Morris publications in Spirou BDoubliées

External links
Lucky Luke official site album index 
Goscinny website on Lucky Luke

Comics by Morris (cartoonist)
Lucky Luke albums
1969 graphic novels
Works originally published in Spirou (magazine)
Works by René Goscinny